Derek Duraisingam (born 21 February 1992) is a Malaysian cricketer. He is a right hand batsman and right arm medium pace bowler.

Career
Duraisingam made his List A cricket debut for Malaysia national cricket team in 2014 ICC World Cricket League Division Three. In this tournament he took 3/23 wickets in a match against Uganda national cricket team on 27 October 2014.

He was a member of the Malaysian cricket team which claimed gold medal in the men's 50 overs tournament after defeating Singapore by 251 runs in the finals at the 2017 Southeast Asian Games.

References

External links 

Profile at Cricbuzz

Malaysian cricketers
1992 births
Living people
Cricketers at the 2010 Asian Games
Southeast Asian Games gold medalists for Malaysia
Southeast Asian Games silver medalists for Malaysia
Southeast Asian Games medalists in cricket
Competitors at the 2017 Southeast Asian Games
Asian Games competitors for Malaysia
Malaysian people of Tamil descent
Malaysian sportspeople of Indian descent